The Kanin Mountains or the Canin Mountains  (Resian: Ćanen), mostly simply Kanin or Canin, are a mountain range in the Western Julian Alps, on the border of Slovenia and Italy. Their highest summit, High Kanin is 2,587 m above sea level. They separate the upper Soča Valley in Slovenia from the Resia Valley in Italy. 

On the Slovenian side of the mountain range, which is part of the Municipality of Bovec, lies a major ski resort, the highest in the country.

The Kanin Mountains are an important identity symbol of the people of the Resia Valley, and several popular songs in the Resian dialect are dedicated to this group, which the locals call Höra ta Ćanïnawa, or simply Ćanen.

Routes 
 2½ hrs  From D Postaja (The D-station of the Gondola lift), a challenging marked route.
 5 hrs From B Postaja (The B-station of the Gondola lift), a very challenging marked route.
 6¼ hrs From the Sella Nevea pass, climbing the via ferrata Rosalba Grasselli, a very challenging marked route.
 4¾ hrs From the Sella Nevea pass, climbing the via ferrata Divisione Julia, a very challenging marked route.

See also 
Kanin-Sella Nevea Ski Resort

References

External links 
 
 Kanin on Geopedia
 Kanin Ski Resort
 Visoki Kanin on Hribi.net, Routes and Photos (slo)

Mountains of the Julian Alps
Mountains of Friuli-Venezia Giulia
Italy–Slovenia border
International mountains of Europe
Two-thousanders of Italy
Two-thousanders of Slovenia